Rina Franchetti (23 December 1907 – 18 August 2010) was an Italian film actress. She appeared in 50 films between 1932 and 1990.

Selected filmography
 Two Happy Hearts (1932)
 La segretaria per tutti (1933)
 The Peddler and the Lady (1943)
 Women and Brigands (1950)
 The Wayward Wife (1953)
 The Steel Rope (1953)
 The White Angel (1955)
 Atom Age Vampire (1963)
 Three Nights of Love (1964)
 Gunman Sent by God (1968)
 Italian Graffiti (1973) 
 Somewhere Beyond Love (1974)

References

External links

1907 births
2010 deaths
Italian film actresses
Italian centenarians
Actresses from Naples
20th-century Italian actresses
Women centenarians